Tropical Cyclone Tiffany was a strong tropical cyclone that made landfall in Queensland and the Northern Territory. The tenth tropical low and the fifth tropical cyclone of the 2021–22 Australian region cyclone season, Tiffany originated from a tropical low south of Papua New Guinea, before intensifying into a tropical cyclone and named Tiffany, peaking as a category 2 tropical cyclone before making landfall in northern Queensland.

Damage from Tiffany totaled at least 50,000 Australian dollars ($36,000 USD), and 1 fatality was reported.

Meteorological history 

On 4 January, the Bureau of Meteorology (BoM) began to monitor the northern Coral Sea for potential  tropical cyclogenesis, as the monsoon trough was forecast to have renewed activity. Four days later, the BoM reported that a tropical low had formed, and designated it as 10U. At the same time, the Joint Typhoon Warning Center (JTWC) gave it a low chance of formation into a tropical cyclone within 24 hours, and the unofficial identifier Invest 90P. At the time, the low was located within a marginal environment for further development, with warm,  sea surface temperatures, moderate to high wind shear, and radial outflow aloft. Within the next 12 hours, the system's low-level circulation center began consolidating, along with deep convection persisting around it, prompting the JTWC to upgrade its chances of development into medium, before subsequently issuing a Tropical Cyclone Formation Alert (TCFA) at 23:30 UTC that same day, noting a small eye feature and improved curved banding on microwave imagery. At 06:00 UTC the next day, the BoM upgraded the tropical low into a category 1 tropical cyclone in the Australian scale, and named it Tiffany. The JTWC subsequently upgraded Tiffany into a tropical storm in the Saffir-Simpson scale three hours later, noting the rapid organization of the system in 12 hours. Moving west under a deep-layered subtropical ridge to its south, Tiffany went on a rapid intensification phase, with the BoM upgrading the storm to a Category 2 tropical cyclone six hours later. Tiffany then rapidly weakened into a category 1 tropical cyclone due to wind shear as it moved over the Princess Charlotte Bay, before subsequently making landfall in the Cape York Peninsula at 06:00 UTC on 10 January. The JTWC downgraded the cyclone to a tropical storm three hours later. Tiffany then weakened into a tropical low as it traversed the peninsula, before emerging over the Gulf of Carpentaria on 11 January.

Upon entering the Gulf of Carpentaria, it started to restrengthen, under a favorable environment of moderate wind shear being offset by very warm,  sea surface temperatures, and strong outflow. At 12:00 UTC that same day, the BoM upgraded Tiffany back into a category 2 tropical cyclone, as the system continued to reintensify. At 00:00 UTC (09:30 ACST) 12 January, Tiffany made its final landfall at Ngukurr in the Northern Territory. The JTWC subsequently issued their final advisory on the system three hours later. Tiffany then weakened into a remnant low and remained traceable overland as it moved west, reaching the Western Australia region on 13 January, before turning southeast in response to a mid-latitude trough moving from the west. It was last noted on 17 January, over central Australia.

Preparations and impact

Papua New Guinea 

No direct impacts on Papua New Guinea were reported, though  of rainfall fell in the southern half of the country.

Australia 
As the system was strengthening to the west of the Cape York Peninsula, cyclone warnings were issued over the region. Tiffany hit many areas still recovering from swells caused by Cyclone Seth. One person died in Queensland after floodwaters struck them, and another person is currently missing. Damage in the Cape York Peninsula was minimal, though many people were urged to hide in shelters or basements. Many people across Queensland, most in Cooktown, were urged to hide or evacuate. A levee failed, and floodwaters rushed into towns. Over 200mm of rain were dumped in many areas of Queensland within a 24-hour period.

As Tiffany approached the Northern Territory, cyclone warnings were also issued in parts of the region. In Groote Eylandt, many areas saw power outages, though damage was generally minimal. In Top End, no major damage was reported, though fallen power lines and flooded roads were reported. One house in Katherine, Northern Territory saw over A$50,000 in damage due to Tiffany, and a car was destroyed by flying branches. In Mataranka, Northern Territory, many trees were downed and flying debris and sticks were reported, causing minor damage to some houses. Katherine saw over 100 millimeters of rain in just 24 hours.

Broome, Western Australia was battered by strong rain, winds, and hail, and many trees were uprooted. Damaging winds also struck Northern Kimberley.

See also 

 2021–22 Australian region cyclone season
 Weather of 2022
 Tropical cyclones in 2022
 Tropical cyclones in Australia

References

External links

Australian Bureau of Meteorology

Category 2 Australian region cyclones

2022 meteorology
2021–22 Australian region cyclone season
Tiffany
Tropical cyclones in the Northern Territory
Tropical cyclones in Queensland
Natural disasters in Australia
2022 in Australia
Natural disasters in Indonesia
Natural disasters in Papua New Guinea
2022 disasters in Oceania